The M2 4.2-inch mortar was a U.S. rifled 4.2-inch (107 mm) mortar used during the Second World War, the Korean War, and the Vietnam War. It entered service in 1943. It was nicknamed the "Goon Gun" (from its large bullet-shaped shells, monopod, and rifled bore – like a rifle for shooting Goons) or the "Four-Deuce" (from its bore size in inches). In 1951 it began to be phased out in favor of the M30 mortar of the same caliber.

History 
The first 4.2-inch mortar in U.S. service was introduced in 1928 and was designated the M1 Chemical Mortar. Development began in 1924 from the British 4-inch (102 mm) Mk I smooth-bore mortar. The addition of rifling increased the caliber to 4.2-inch. It was ostensibly meant to fire only smoke shells, as the postwar peace lobby opposed military spending on explosive or poison gas shells.

The M2 could be disassembled into three parts to allow it to be carried by its crew. The cap contained a built-in fixed firing pin.

Upon the entry of the United States into World War II, the U.S. Army decided to develop a high explosive round for the mortar so that it could be used in a fragmentation role against enemy personnel. The modified mortar was redesignated the M2. The M2 was first used in the Sicilian Campaign, where some 35,000 rounds of ammunition were fired from the new weapon. Subsequently, the mortar proved to be an especially useful weapon in areas of rough terrain such as mountains and jungle, into which artillery pieces could not be moved. The M2 was gradually replaced in U.S. service from 1951 by the M30 mortar.

Starting in December 1942, the US Army experimented with self-propelled 4.2-inch mortar carriers. Two pilot vehicles based on the M3A1 halftrack were built, designated 4.2-inch Mortar Carriers T21 and T21E1. The program was cancelled in 1945.

Before the invasion of Peleliu in September, 1944, the U.S. Navy mounted three mortars each on the decks of four Landing Craft Infantry and designated them LCI(M).  They provided useful fire support in situations where conventional naval gunfire, with its flat trajectory, was not effective.  Increased numbers of LCI(M) were used in the invasions of the Philippines and Iwo Jima. Sixty LCI(M) were used during the invasion of Okinawa and adjoining islands with Navy personnel operating the mortars.

Tactical organization 
4.2-inch mortars were employed by chemical mortar battalions.  Each battalion was authorized forty-eight M2 4.2-inch mortars organized into four companies with three four-tube platoons. Between December 1944 and February 1945, the battalions’ Companies D were inactivated to organize additional battalions.  In World War II, an infantry division was often supported by one or two chemical mortar companies with twelve mortars each. In some instances an entire battalion was attached to a division. In the Korean War, an organic heavy mortar company of eight 4.2-inch mortars was assigned each infantry regiment while Marine regiments had a mortar company with twelve mortars.

Ammunition 
The M2 has a rifled barrel, unusual for a mortar.  Thus its ammunition lacks stabilizing tailfins common to most mortars.

The mortar's M3 high explosive (HE) shell packed 3.64 kilograms of explosive charge, placing it between the M1 105-mm HE shell (2.18 kilograms of charge) and M102 155-mm HE shell (6.88 kilograms of charge) in terms of blast effect. The mortar could also fire white phosphorus-based smoke shells and mustard gas shells. The official designation of the latter was Cartridge, Mortar, 4.2-inch. Mustard gas was not used in these wars and the U.S. ended up with a large number of these shells, declaring over 450,000 of them in stockpile in 1997 when the Chemical Weapons Treaty came into force. Destruction efforts to eliminate this stockpile are continuing with a few of these aged shells occasionally found to be leaking.

Users 

 : used 
 : used

See also 
Weapons of comparable role, performance and era
 ML 4.2-inch mortar – British mortar.
 107mm M1938 mortar – Soviet mortar.

Notes

Notes

References
 Infantry Weapons of the KOREAN WAR Mortars: 4.2-inch M2 Mortar
 History of the 4.2-inch mortar
 Jane's Infantry Weapons 1984–1985, Ian Hogg (ed.), London: Jane's Publishing Company Ltd., 1984. .
 
 Army Service Forces Catalog CW 11-1

External links 

 Popular Science, April 1940, Army's Smoke Throwers early detailed article on 4.2 mortar
 Adding Firepower to Infantry: The 4.2-Inch Chemical Mortar – by Christopher Miskimon, courtesy of the Warfare History Network

World War II infantry weapons of the United States
World War II artillery of the United States
Infantry mortars
107 mm artillery
Mortars of the United States
Chemical weapons of the United States
Chemical weapon delivery systems
World War II mortars
Weapons and ammunition introduced in 1943